Sherman Island may refer to:
Sherman Island (Antarctica)
Sherman Island (California)